China National Highway 221 runs from Harbin to Tongjiang, in Heilongjiang Province. It is 668 kilometres in length and runs northeast from Harbin towards Tongjiang.

Route and distance

See also
 China National Highways

External links
Official website of Ministry of Transport of PRC

221
Transport in Heilongjiang